The Washington Open (known as the Citi Open for sponsorship reasons) is an annual hardcourt tennis tournament played at the William H.G. FitzGerald Tennis Center in Rock Creek Park in Washington, D.C. The Washington Open is part of the ATP Tour 500, WTA 250, and the US Open Series, the latter of which is a schedule of North American hard court events leading into the US Open.

After the 2014 edition, the Washington Open dropped out of the US Open Series, showing frustration over US Open Series broadcaster ESPN providing little coverage of the tournament on television. As of 2019, the Washington Open has rejoined the series, but still maintains the broadcast agreement it had reached with Tennis Channel.

History
The tournament was first held on the men's tour in 1969, known as the Washington Star International between 1969 and 1981, as the Sovran Bank Classic from 1982 to 1992, as the Newsweek Tennis Classic in 1993, and as the Legg Mason Tennis Classic from 1994 to 2011. Competition was held on outdoor clay courts until 1986, when it switched to the current hard courts. Throughout its existence, the tournament has been closely associated with Donald Dell, founder of ProServ International, who was instrumental in its creation, as well as John A. Harris, founder of Potomac Ventures Investments. The location of the event in Washington, D.C. was chosen at the urging of Arthur Ashe, an early supporter.

The women's event was first held in 2011 in College Park, Maryland as the Citi Open, and for the 2012 season, the ATP and WTA decided to merge their Maryland and Washington spots into a joint tournament, with the women's event moving to the William H.G. FitzGerald Tennis Center, and Citi taking over Legg Mason as title sponsor of the joint event.

In 2015, the Washington Open dropped out of the US Open Series. Due to its ownership of rights to the US Open beginning that year, ESPN began holding exclusive domestic broadcast rights to all US Open Series events . However, the network only promised that a minimum of four hours of coverage would be aired on ESPN2 (in 2014, coverage was split between ESPN and Tennis Channel), relegating the remainder to ESPN3 online streaming. Donald Dell criticized ESPN for using ESPN3 to acquire sports rights without any intent to broadcast them on television, stating "If you're running a tournament, and it's two million dollars, and sponsorship money in the six million to eight million dollar range, you've got sponsors that don't want to be having only four or six hours on television." As a result, the Citi Open withdrew from the US Open Series so it could establish a new broadcast rights agreement with Tennis Channel. The four-year, $2.1 million deal included 171 hours of television coverage spanning the entire tournament, and funding for additional amenities (including a second televised court).

In 2019, the tournament was acquired by businessman Mark Ein, and returned to the US Open Series. Tennis Channel reached a five-year extension of its media rights.

Past finals

In the men's singles, Andre Agassi (1990–91, 1995, 1998–99) holds the records for most titles (five) and most finals overall (six, runner-up in 2000). He also shares with Michael Chang (1996–97), Juan Martín del Potro (2008–09) and Alexander Zverev (2017–18) the record for most consecutive titles, with two. In the women's singles, Magdaléna Rybáriková (2012–13) holds the record for most titles (two) and co-holds the record for most finals (two) with Anastasia Pavlyuchenkova (runner-up in 2012, 2015). In the men's doubles, Marty Riessen (1971–72, 1974, 1979) and the Bryan brothers (2005–07, 2015) hold the record for most titles (four), with the Bryans also holding the record for most consecutive titles (three). The Bryans co-hold the record for most finals (six, runners-up in 2001–02) with Raúl Ramírez (winner in 1976, 1981–82, runner-up in 1975, 1978–79). In the women's doubles, Shuko Aoyama (2012–14) holds alone the record for most titles, most consecutive titles and most finals (three).

Men's singles

Women's singles

Men's doubles

Women's doubles

See also
 Virginia Slims of Washington – women's tournament (1972–1991)
 Washington Kastles – World Team Tennis franchise

Notes

References

External links

 Association of Tennis Professionals (ATP) tournament profile

 
Hard court tennis tournaments in the United States
WTA Tour
Tennis in Washington, D.C.
Recurring sporting events established in 1969
US Open Series
ATP Tour 500
1969 establishments in Washington, D.C.